The fourth series of the Australian competitive cooking game show My Kitchen Rules commenced on 28 January 2013 and concluded on 28 April 2013 on Seven Network.

Format Changes
Gatecrasher Round: Three additional "gatecrasher" teams entered the show after the instant restaurant round of Group 2. They competed against the bottom three teams from the remaining 10, in a third round of instant restaurants .
Comeback Kitchen: A number of teams were eliminated on more than one occasion. After their initial elimination, they were brought back through a "Comeback Kitchen" which saw teams compete for one remaining spot in the finals. Losing teams were "re-eliminated" from the competition. This challenge saw eliminated teams cooking meals to order for judge, Colin Fassnidge's restaurant 4Fourteen. Patrons paid for what they thought the meals were worth and the winning or losing teams advanced or were re-eliminated.
Blind Tastings: For all Sudden Death Cook-Offs guest judges no longer knew who cooked which dish.

Teams
For this series, Queensland, South Australia, and Tasmania each commenced with two teams, while New South Wales, Victoria and Western Australia each had three teams (two original teams and one "gatecrasher" team) A team's Group 1, 2 or gatecrasher status was only of significance in the Instant restaurant rounds.

Elimination History

 Notes
 — After Lisa & Candice were eliminated, the total tally of the instant restaurant scores were shown and the three lowest scorers out of the remaining ten teams were Ali & Samuel, Lisa & Stefano and Dan & Steph. They competed in another instant restaurant round with the three gatecrasher teams. These gatecrasher teams were introduced after the last instant restaurant of the second group (Jenna & Joanna).
 — The winners of the People's Choice were given the pleasure of choosing one other team to be safe with them, through to the next round.
 — Finishing first on the instant restaurant leaderboards, these three teams were exempt from this challenge and safe from elimination.
 — The 'Comeback Kitchen' rounds were separate challenges from the main competition and occurred alongside the main stream. Only eliminated teams between the Top 12 and Top 6 (except Josh and Andi due to personal reasons) participated in the Comeback Kitchen.

Competition Details

Instant Restaurant Round

Round 1
 Episodes 1 to 6
 Airdate — 28 January to 6 February
 Description — The first of the two instant restaurant groups are introduced into the competition in Round 1. The lowest scoring team at the end of this round is eliminated.

Round 2
 Episodes 7 to 12
 Airdate — 7 February to 18 February
 Description — The second of the two instant restaurant groups are introduced into the competition in Round 2. The same rules from the previous round apply and the lowest scoring team is eliminated.

Round 3 (Gatecrasher Round)
 Episodes 13 to 18 
 Airdate — 19 February to 27 February
 Description — In the third round of instant restaurants, the three lowest scoring safe teams in the first two groups combined, into another instant restaurant round. From here, three newly introduced 'gatecrasher' teams also joined the round. As per the first two rounds, the same format of scoring is repeated and the lowest scoring team is eliminated.

Top 12

People's Choice Challenge: Annual Block Party 
 Episode 19
 Airdate – 28 February 2013
 Location - Kings Cross, Sydney, NSW
 Description – Teams were challenged to cook in the kitchens of small compact apartments. Five teams chose to cook a main, and four teams cooked a dessert. Their meals were served to 50 guests for the annual block party. Guests voted for their favourite dish and the team with the most votes won the People's Choice.

 Note
  — Finishing first on the instant restaurant leaderboards, Mick & Matt, Luke & Scott, and Ali & Samuel were granted immunity status and did not participate on the round.

Rapid Cook-off: Herb Challenge 
 Episode 20
 Airdate – 4 March 2013
 Description – During the rapid cook-off, teams were challenged to create a dish in 30 minutes using one of four types of herb namely: basil, coriander, mint, and thyme. At the 15 minute mark, the clock was unexpectedly stopped and a twist was thrown in. For the remaining 15 minutes, only one team member was allowed to cook. All teams were reviewed by the judges, with the top 3 teams safe from elimination and the bottom 4 competing in a following showdown. Spice was the main component of the second showdown. Once again, teams were reviewed and the weakest headed to the sudden death cook-off to face Kieran and Nastassia.

Sudden Death 
 Episode 21
 Airdate – 5 March 2013
 Description – Two teams, VIC's Sam and Chris and WA's Kieran and Nastassia battle it out, producing a three course meal for Pete and Manu as well as four guest judges. The teams are judged and scored, with the weakest team eliminated from the competition. This is the first sudden death in MKR to introduce Blind Tastings, where the judges will not know who cooked which dish.

 Note
  - After being eliminated, Kieran and Nastassia headed to the Comeback Kitchen to compete for a place in the finals

Top 11

People's Choice Challenge: Market Food 
 Episode 22
 Airdate – 6 March 2013
 Location - Sydney Markets, Flemington, NSW
 Description – Teams were given 90 minutes to buy their produce, cook and set up their stalls ready to sell their meals to the public. They were to set their own pricings and food offers. The team who made the most money won the People's Choice, whilst Pete and Manu chose the weakest team. The winners of the People's Choice were not only safe from elimination themselves, but were able to choose one other team to be safe with them.

Rapid Cook-off: Breakfast Challenge 
 Episode 23
 Airdate – 7 March 2013
 Description – In this rapid cook-off, teams were to create a breakfast dish using a set main ingredient namely: bacon, fruit, mushrooms or tomato. Adding a further twist, after getting ingredients ready from the store room, teams were to cook their breakfasts transferring to someone else's prepared ingredients. All dishes are judged and the bottom 4 teams competed in a showdown to create the best chicken dish.

Sudden Death 
 Episode 24
 Airdate – 11 March 2013
 Description – Sudden death cook-off between the 'Cupcakes' Jenna and Joanna and father-son duo, Mick and Matt.
{|class="wikitable plainrowheaders" style="margin:1em auto; text-align:center; font-size:90%; width:80em;"
! colspan="10"  | Sudden Death
|-
! rowspan="2" colspan="2"| Team
! colspan="6" | Judge's scores
! rowspan="2" | Total
! rowspan="2" | Result
|-
! Karen
! Guy
! Liz
! Colin
! Pete
! Manu
|-
| 
!  Jenna & Joanna
| 7
| 7
| 7
| 7
| 7
| 7
| 42
| rowspan="4"| Safe
|- 
! rowspan="3"| Dishes
| Entree
| colspan="7"| Squid with Fennel and Herb Salad
|- 
| Main
| colspan="7"| Braised Beef Ribs, Chickpea Puree and Broccolini
|-
| Dessert
| colspan="7"| Mango Mousse with Toffee-Dipped Macadamias
|- style="border-top:3px solid #aaa;"
| 
!  Mick & Matt
| 5
| 5
| 5
| 4
| 6
| 6
| 31| rowspan="4" style="background:lightpink"| Eliminated
|- 
! rowspan="3"| Dishes
| Entree
| colspan="7"| Hot and Spicy Prawns with Coconut Lime Rice
|- 
| Main
| colspan="7"| Grilled Trevalla with Lentils and Raita
|-
| Dessert
| colspan="7"| Cappuccino Cheesecake with Toasted Meringue
|}
 Note
  - After being eliminated, Mick and Matt headed to the Comeback Kitchen to compete for a place in the finals

 Top 10 

 People's Choice Challenge: Kids' Lunch (Children's Choice) 
 Episode 25 Airdate – 12 March 2013
 Location - Taronga Zoo, Sydney, NSW
 Description – The teams were required to make a healthy and delicious lunch for two hundred kids. The team with the most votes won the children's choice, while the team with the least impressive meal, judged by Pete and Manu, went straight to the Sudden Death.

 Rapid Cook-off: Four-course Meal Challenge 
 Episode 26 Airdate – 13 March 2013
 Description – The eight teams were split into two groups of four: white group and black group. Each group had to cook a combined four-course meal in 30 minutes. This challenge involved teamwork within the group as the meal was judged as a whole. The weaker group headed to the showdown which challenged teams to create a dish using two ingredients that go together really well.

 Sudden Death 
 Episode 27 Airdate – 14 March 2013
 Description – Third sudden death cook-off. Angela and Melina against Ali and Samuel. Losing team is eliminated.

 Note
  - After being eliminated, Ali and Samuel headed to the Comeback Kitchen to compete for a place in the finals

 Top 9 
 People's Choice Challenge: Melbourne Cup Canapé 
 Episode 28 Airdate – 18 March 2013
 Location - Flemington Racecourse, Melbourne, VIC
 Description – Teams headed to the 2012 Melbourne Cup serving canapés to the A-Listers at the Emirates Marquee. Like previous People's Choice challenges, guests voted for their favourite dish, whilst Pete and Manu chose the weakest. This particular challenge was difficult for the judges as they themselves claimed that all teams cooked the best food across all series of My Kitchen Rules.

 Rapid Cook-off: Aussie Favourites 
 Episode 29 Airdate – 19 March 2013
 Description – Teams were challenged to use one of eggplant, pumpkin, prawns or salmon to cook a pasta dish in 30 minutes. Both the challenge and ingredients were selected by the Australian public through Facebook. Similar to previous rapid cook-offs, the four weakest teams competed in a following showdown. For the showdown, teams showcased their own favourite dishes. The weakest team from this challenge will head to sudden death.

 Sudden Death 
 Episode 30 Airdate – 20 March 2013
 Description – Sudden death cook-off between Jake & Elle and Angela & Melina. Lower scoring team is eliminated. Angela and Melina are the only team so far to have competed in the sudden death more than once.

 Note
  - After being eliminated, Angela and Melina headed to the Comeback Kitchen to compete for a place in the finals

 Top 8 

 People's Choice Challenge: Budget Challenge 
 Episode 31 Airdate – 1 April 2013
 Description – Teams must cook to a budget of $10 each, however they were split into two groups of four and were required to pool their money together, resulting in $40 of ingredients per group. Dishes are judged and scored out of 10 by the opposite group through a blind tasting. There was a People's Choice winner from both groups, resulting in two teams being safe from elimination.

 Rapid Cook-off: Winter Warmers
 Episode 32 Airdate – 2 April 2013
 Description – For the Rapid cook-off, teams were to create a winter warmer dish. As a twist, only one member of the team could use the stove, whilst the other can only prepare the ingredients. Only one of the five teams was safe after the cook-off. For the Showdown, teams were challenged to produce a decadent chocolate dessert. The weakest team from the showdown headed to the Sudden Death cook-off.

 Sudden Death
 Episode 33 Airdate – 3 April 2013
 Description – Fifth sudden death cook-off. This time Josh and Andi against Ashlee and Sophia. As per usual, both teams produce a three-course menu, the lower scoring team is eliminated.

 Note
  - Unlike other eliminated teams from the Top 12 to Top 6, Josh and Andi did not participate in the Comeback Kitchen to return to the competition. Due to Andi's pregnancy, the team turned down the challenge as a personal request. It was also revealed that Josh and Andi had pre-planned with the producers, prior to the cook-off, that they were to leave the competition exactly at that point, regardless of whatever the outcome.

 Comeback Kitchen Week 1 
 Episode 34 Airdate – 7 April 2013
 Description – Four eliminated teams from the original Top 12, Kieran & Nastassia, Mick & Matt, Ali & Samuel and Angela & Melina, competed in a special comeback kitchen. This special challenge is held and run by new judge, Colin Fassnidge in his Sydney restaurant, 4Fourteen. The four teams designed a two course menu for Colin to review, who then sent the three best teams to serve and cook their two-course menu to order, for paying customers and to judges, Pete and Manu for a blind tasting. Customers paid for what they think the meal was worth. The team who made the highest amount of money automatically headed to the next Comeback Kitchen, whilst the weakest team was re-eliminated and lost their chance to return to the competition. Two remaining teams progressed to the next comeback kitchen.
 This format repeated for the following two comeback kitchens, with newly eliminated teams from the Top 7 and Top 6 sent directly to the challenge after leaving headquarters. Eventually there was one winner, who won the chance to return to the main competition.

 Top 7: WA Week 
All challenges for this week were offsite and held in various locations of Western Australia, including Cable Beach, Margaret River and Perth. The planned challenges took advantage of the seafood and fresh produce uniquely available in this region.

 People's Choice Challenge: 5-Star Seafood Platter 
 Episode 35 Airdate – 8 April 2013
 Location - Cable Beach, Broome, WA
 Description – This challenge was split into two parts. The first mini challenge required teams to head into the water and fish. The team who caught the heaviest load was given the power to choose their choice of seafood for the cooking challenge and determine the order in which the remaining teams pick. The seafood chosen in order were; Threadfin Salmon, Red Emperor, Barramundi, Tropical Perch, Rock Lobster, Squid & Prawns and Mud Crab. Teams must use their chosen seafood and create a five-star platter for tourists of the region. A People's Choice winner was declared and the weakest team headed to the next sudden death.

 Rapid Cook-off: Farm Fresh 
 Episode 36 Airdate – 9 April 2013
 Location - Margaret River, WA
 Description – Teams headed to Margaret River, Western Australia to cater for the 100th farmers anniversary. Their challenge was to cook 100 meals for 100 farmers in 100 minutes. All produce was taken fresh and directly from the farm patch. Pete and Manu chose the weakest team to face sudden death against Jenna and Joanna.

 Sudden Death 
 Episode 37 Airdate – 10 April 2013
 Location - Perth CBD, WA
 Description – Sudden death cook-off between Jenna & Joanna and Kerrie & Craig. This cook-off was held in Perth, instead of kitchen headquarters. Losing team is eliminated and heads to the next Comeback Kitchen.

 Note
  - After being eliminated, Jenna and Joanna headed to the Comeback Kitchen to compete for a place in the finals

 Comeback Kitchen Week 2 
 Episode 38 Airdate – 14 April 2013
 Description – Jenna & Joanna join Mick & Matt and Angela & Melina in the second Comeback kitchen to compete for a place in the finals. All teams must design and create a two course menu to be served to paying customers and Pete and Manu for a full operational restaurant. It was decided that all three teams progressed to the next round of serving the dishes. In the end, the team who made the most money automatically headed to the final Comeback kitchen, whilst the weakest team is re-eliminated from the competition.

 Top 6: Finals Decider Week 
At the end of this week, only four teams will remain. There was no People's Choice or rapid cook-off, instead winners from the offsite Food Truck challenge were given advantages for the finals deciders, rather than being safe from elimination. As there were two eliminations, two sudden death cook-offs were held.

 Food Truck Challenge 
 Episode 39 Airdate – 15 April 2013
 Location - Sydney CBD, NSW
 Description – Teams had to cook in food truck kitchens to a theme according to whichever truck key they pulled out of a hat. Teams were split into two groups and were to serve their food to the public. Pete and Manu chose two winning teams and they were then granted the advantageous opportunity to decide which two teams will cook against them in the next elimination round.

 Finals Decider: Group 1 
 Episode 40 Airdate – 16 April 2013
 Description – Round 1 of 2 elimination cook-offs. Teams competing were chosen by Ashlee and Sophia, after winning the previous challenge. They were also able to allocate specific ingredients to the other teams; kidney, apples or walnuts. One of the three teams went straight to the finals, whilst the other two competed in a following sudden death cook-off

 Note
  - After being eliminated, Ashlee and Sophia headed to the Comeback Kitchen to compete for a place in the finals

 Finals Decider: Group 2 
 Episode 41 Airdate – 17 April 2013
 Description – Second round of finals deciders. This time under the reigns of Luke and Scott. From winning the previous truck challenge, Luke and Scott were able to allocate the three main ingredients for the other teams and themselves. Ingredients available were ginger, cherries and eel. One team progressed to the finals after the first cook-off and the other teams competed in a subsequent sudden death cook-off with the losing team being eliminated

 Note
  - After being eliminated, Kerrie and Craig headed to the Comeback Kitchen to compete for a place in the finals

 Comeback Kitchen Week 3 
 Episode 42 Airdate – 21 April 2013
 Description – After two eliminations from the main competition, Ashlee & Sophia along with Kerrie & Craig join Angela & Melina and Mick & Matt in the final Comeback Kitchen. As per usual, all four teams were to design a two course, Main and Dessert meal. These were presented to Colin who only allowed three teams to progress to the next round of restaurant operation. In the end, the team who made the least amount of money was immediately out of the running, while the judges picked one of the two remaining teams to return into the finals.

 Final 5 
 Episode 43 Airdate – 22 April 2013
 Description – The Top 4 teams were given a surprise announcement when an eliminated team returned to the competition after their victory from Comeback Kitchen. Teams had to create an Amuse-bouche, a single bite-sized creation in 60 minutes. The three best teams progressed to the Semifinals, whilst the weakest two competed in a Sudden death, the losing team was eliminated. Teams were also ranked from 1st to 4th to determine who cooks against whom in the semifinals. For Semifinal 1, 2nd place will play 3rd and for Semifinal 2, 1st place will play 4th.

Semifinals

 Semifinal 1 
 Episode 44 Airdate – 23 April 2013
 Description – The finals have arrived, commencing with Semifinal 1, Queensland's Dan and Steph versus New South Wales' Luke and Scott. Both teams will cook their ultimate three-course meal for guest judges and Pete and Manu. The winning team advances to the Grand Final for a chance at the $250,000 prize.

 Semifinal 2 
 Episode 45 Airdate – 24 April 2013
 Description – In the second semifinal, Jake and Elle take on 'Comeback Kings' Mick and Matt. Both teams fight for the second position in the Grand final, once again producing a three-course meal for guest judges and Pete & Manu.

 Grand Final 
 Episode 46 Airdate – 28 April 2013
 Description' – Dan & Steph are the first team to enter the MKR 2013 grand final followed by fellow Queensland team, Jake and Elle. Both teams take on the challenge for the MKR 2013 title and the $250,000 prize. Serving a five-course meal, totalling 100 plates of food each, to guest judges and Pete and Manu for the final verdict. Friends, family and eliminated contestants are all back to join the party, as Costa Del Sol and Decadence open their doors. This is the second grand final of MKR where both teams are from the same state, following the South Australian teams from the 2012 finale.

 Ratings 
The television nightly ratings on aggregate figures of the 2013 series of My Kitchen Rules'' on free-to-air Seven Network channel were gathered from TV Tonight covering only the five city metro across Australia, namely: Adelaide, Brisbane, Melbourne, Perth, and Sydney. The number of viewers presented in the table below are in millions.

 Colour key:
  – Highest rating during the series
  – Lowest rating during the series
  – An elimination was held in this episode
  – Finals week

References 

2013 Australian television seasons
My Kitchen Rules